The 2014–15 San Diego Toreros men's basketball team represented the University of San Diego during the 2014–15 NCAA Division I men's basketball season. This was head coach Bill Grier's eighth season at San Diego. The Toreros competed in the West Coast Conference and played their home games at the Jenny Craig Pavilion. They finished the season 15–16, 8–10 in WCC play to finish in fifth place. They lost in the quarterfinals of the WCC tournament to Pepperdine.

On March 16, head coach Bill Grier was fired. He had an eight-year record of 117–144.

Previous season
The Toreros finish the season 18–17, 7–11 in WCC play to finish in a tie for sixth place. They lost in the quarterfinals of the WCC tournament to San Francisco. They were invited to the CollegeInsider.com Postseason Tournament where they defeated Portland State and Sam Houston State to advance to the quarterfinals where they lost to fellow WCC member Pacific.

Departures

Recruits class of 2014

Recruits class of 2015

Roster

Schedule and results

|-
!colspan=12 style="background:#97CAFF; color:#002654;"| Non-conference regular season

|-
!colspan=12 style="background:#002654; color:#97CAFF;"| WCC regular season

|-
!colspan=9 style="background:#97CAFF; color:#002654;"| WCC tournament

See also
2014–15 San Diego Toreros women's basketball team

References

San Diego Toreros men's basketball seasons
San Diego